The Adirondack Mountains (a-də-RÄN-dak) form a massif in northeastern New York with boundaries that correspond roughly to those of Adirondack Park. The current relief owes much to glaciation. There are more than 200 lakes around the mountains, including Lake George, Lake Placid, and Lake Tear of the Clouds, which is the source of the Hudson River.

Etymology 
The word Adirondack is thought to come from the Mohawk word ha-de-ron-dah meaning "eaters of trees". The earliest written use of the name was in 1635 by Harmen Meyndertsz Van Den Bogaert in his Mohawk to Dutch glossary, found in his Journey into Mohawk Country. He spelled it Adirondakx and said that it stood for Frenchmen, meaning the Algonquians who allied with the French. Another early use of the name, spelled Rontaks, was in 1729 by French missionary Joseph-François Lafitau. He explained that the word was used by the Iroquois as a derogatory term for groups of Algonquians who did not practice agriculture and therefore sometimes had to eat tree bark to survive harsh winters.

The Mohawks had no written language, so Europeans used various phonetic spellings of the word, including Achkokx, Rondaxe, and Adirondax. Such words were strongly associated with the region, but they were not yet considered a place name; an English map from 1761 labels the area simply Deer Hunting Country. In 1837, the mountains were named Adirondacks by Ebenezer Emmons.

Human history 

Humans have lived in the region of the Adirondack Mountains since the Paleo-Indian period (15,000 to 7,000 BC), shortly after the last ice age. The first group to move into the area came south from the St. Lawrence River Valley and settled along the shores of the Champlain Sea around 13,000 BC. These Archaic period people, known as the Laurentian culture, were semi-nomadic hunter-gatherers. Evidence for their presence in the Adirondacks includes a projectile point of red-brown chert found in 2007 at the edge of Tupper Lake.

Over the next 11,000 or so years, the region's climate slowly warmed, and forests began to replace the original tundra. Transitioning from the Archaic Period to the Woodland period, multiple different cultures— Sylvan Lake, River, Middlesex, Point Peninsula, and Owasco cultures— replaced the Laurentian culture over time. By the time of the Owasco culture, around 0 AD, maize and beans were being cultivated in the Adirondack uplands.

The first Iroquoian peoples, the Mohawk (or Kanyengehaga) and the Oneida (or Oneyotdehaga), arrived in the Adirondack region between 4,000 and 1,200 years ago. Both groups claimed the Adirondack Mountains as hunting grounds. According to Haudenosaunee historian Rick Hill, the region was considered a 'Dish with One Spoon,' symbolizing shared hunting resources between the groups. A group of Algonquian people, known as the Mahicans, also occupied the region, particularly the Hudson River Valley.

These were the groups that the first European explorers of the area encountered. European presence in the area began with a battle between Samuel de Champlain and a group of Mohawks, in what is now Ticonderoga in 1609. The Jesuit missionary Isaac Jogues became the first recorded European to travel through the center of the Adirondacks, as the captive of a Mohawk hunting party, in 1642.

The early European perception of the Adirondacks was of a vast, inhospitable wilderness. One map of the area from 1771 shows the region as a blank space in the northeastern corner of New York. In 1784, Thomas Pownhall wrote that the Native Americans referred to the area as "the Dismal Wilderness, or the Habitation of Winter," and that the area was "either not much known to them, or, if known, very wisely by them kept from the Knowledge of the Europeans." He clearly had the impression that native people did not live within the Adirondack mountains.

Because local Iroquoian and Algonquian tribes had been decimated first by smallpox and measles in the 1600s, then by wars with encroaching European settlers, there likely were very few people living in the region by the time Pownhall wrote his description. It is only relatively recently that numerous archaeological finds have definitively shown that Native Americans were indeed very present in the Adirondacks before European contact, hunting, making pottery, and practicing agriculture.

The European impression of a wild region devoid of human connection set up a narrative about wilderness that would persist through the next 200-some years of the region's history. While society's perception of the Adirondacks' value changed, they were always seen as a land of natural resources and physical beauty, not of human history. First the area was an inhospitable tangle, then a lucrative store of lumber. After the American Revolutionary War, New York State gained ownership of most of the land in the region.

Needing money to discharge war debts, the government sold nearly all the original public acreage about 7 million acres for pennies an acre. Lumbermen were welcomed to the interior, with few restraints, resulting in massive deforestation. Later, the wilderness character of the region became popular with the rise of the Romantic movement, and the Adirondacks became a destination for those wishing to escape the evils of city life. Rising concern over water quality and deforestation led to the creation of the Adirondack Park in 1885. In 1989, part of the Adirondack region was designated by UNESCO as the Champlain-Adirondack Biosphere Reserve.

For the more recent human history of the Adirondack region, see the page Adirondack Park.

Geology 

The rocks of the Adirondack mountains originated about two billion years ago as 50,000 feet (ca. 15,240 m) thick sediments at the bottom of a sea located near the equator. Because of plate tectonics these collided with Laurentia (the precursor of modern North America) in a mountain building episode known as the Grenville orogeny. During this time the sedimentary rock was changed into metamorphic rock. It is these Proterozoic minerals and lithologies that make up the core of the massif. Minerals of interest include:
 wollastonite, mined near Harrisville
 magnetite and hematite, formerly mined at the Benson Mines, Lyon Mountain, Mineville, Tahawus, and Witherbee.
 graphite, mined near Hague and Ticonderoga.
 garnet, mined at the Barton Mine, north of Gore Mountain.
 anorthosite, visible in road cuts on the New York State Route 3 between Saranac Lake and Tupper Lake.
 marble
 zinc: The Balmat-Edwards district on the northwest flank of the massif also in St. Lawrence County was a major zinc ore deposit
 titanium was mined at Tahawus.

Note: the Adirondacks are uplifted by a hot spot in the Canadian Shield in contrast to other mountain ranges in New York which are a part of the Appalachian chain (not to be confused with the cultural region of Appalachia).

Around 600 million years ago, as Laurentia drifted away from Baltica (European Craton), the area began to be pulled apart forming the Iapetus Ocean. Faults developed, running north to northeast which formed valleys and deep lakes. Examples visible today include the grabens Lake George and Schroon Lake. By this time the Grenville mountains had been eroded away and the area was covered by a shallow sea. Several thousand feet of sediment accumulated on the sea bed. Trilobites were the principal life-form of the sea bed, and fossil tracks can be seen in the Potsdam sandstone floor of the Paul Smiths Visitor Interpretive Center.

About 10 million years ago, the region began to be uplifted. It has been lifted about 7000 feet (ca. 2,134 meters) and is continuing at about 2 millimeters per year, which is greater than the rate of denudation. The cause of the uplift is unknown, but geologists theorize that it is caused by a hot spot in the earth's crust. A recent study has revealed a column of seismically slow materials about 50–80 km deep beneath the Adirondack Mountains, which was interpreted to be the upwelling asthenosphere contributing to the uplift of the mountains. The occurrence of earthquake swarms near the center of the massif at Blue Mountain Lake may be evidence of this. Some of the earthquakes have exceeded 5 on the Richter magnitude scale.

Starting about 2.5 million years ago, a cycle of Pleistocene glacial and interglacial periods began which covered the area in ice. During the most recent episode, the Laurentide Ice Sheet covered most of northern North America between about 95,000 and c. 20,000 years ago. After this the climate warmed, but it took nearly 10,000 years for a 10,000 feet (ca. 3,048 m) thick layer of ice to completely melt. Evidence of this period includes:
 Eskers: the Rainbow Lake esker bisects the eponymous lake and extends discontinuously for 85 miles (ca. 137 km). Another long discontinuous esker extends from Mountain Pond through Keese Mill, passing between Upper St. Regis Lake and the Spectacle Ponds, and continuing to Ochre, Fish, and Lydia Ponds in the St. Regis Canoe Area. A 150-foot-high esker bisects the Five Ponds Wilderness Area.
 Glacial erratics: there is a large one at the Newcomb Visitor Information Center next to the Rich Lake Trail.
 Kames
 Moraines
 The cirques that characterize the Whiteface Mountain.
 Outwash plains: St. Regis Canoe Area is an outwash plain pitted with kettle holes.

Soils in the area are generally thin, sandy, acidic, and infertile, having developed since the glacial retreat.

Climate 
The climate is strongly continental, with high humidity and precipitation year-round. Spring (April–May) and fall (September–November) are short transitional seasons.

Ecology 

The Adirondack Mountains form the southernmost part of the Eastern forest-boreal transition ecoregion. They are heavily forested, and contain one of the southernmost distributions of the taiga ecotype in North America. The forests of the Adirondacks include spruce, pine and deciduous trees. Lumbering, once an important industry, has been much restricted by the creation of state forest preserve.

The mountains include many wetlands, of which there are three kinds:
 swamps, any wetland including trees and shrubs.
 marshes, wetlands with water stagnation. These may support bullfrogs, spring peepers, spotted salamanders, great blue herons, American bitterns, and painted turtles. Pickerel weed often forms large colonies.
 bogs, characterized by plants like sphagnum moss, orchids, and pitcher plants.

Breeding birds include northern forest specialists not found anywhere else in the state, such as boreal chickadees, Canada jays, spruce grouse, black-backed woodpeckers, common loons and crossbills. Mammals include raccoons, beavers, river otters, bobcats, moose, black bears, and coyotes. Extirpated or extinct mammals that formerly roamed the Adirondacks include the eastern cougar, eastern elk, wolverine, caribou, eastern wolf, and the Canada lynx. Attempted reintroductions of elk and lynx in the 20th century failed for numerous reasons, including poaching, vehicle collisions, and conservation incompetence.

Nearly 60 percent of the park is covered with northern hardwood forest. Above , conditions are too poor for hardwoods to thrive, and the trees become mixed with or replaced by balsam fir and red spruce. Above  black spruce replace red. Higher still, only trees short enough to be covered in snow during the winter can survive.

A small area on the highest peaks exists above the tree line and has an alpine climate.

References

External links

 
Mountain ranges of New York (state)
Adirondack province
Regions of New York (state)
Upstate New York